Kitabatake Akiyoshi (北畠顕能) (1326–1383) was a Kamakura period military figure who defended the Southern Court during the Nanboku-chō period.

The son of Kitabatake Chikafusa, he helped lead loyalist forces in the capture of Kyoto in 1352.

He is enshrined at Kitabatake Shrine in Tsu, Mie Prefecture.

References

1326 births
1383 deaths
People of Kamakura-period Japan